Jacques Cartier (1491–1557) was a French explorer.

Jacques Cartier  may also refer to:

People
 Jacques Cartier (businessman) (1750–1814), Canadian entrepreneur and politician
 Jacques Cartier (jeweler) (1885–1942), French jeweller

Places

Québec, Canada
Natural features 
 Jacques-Cartier River
 Jacques Cartier Strait
 Mont Jacques-Cartier, mountain
 Lac-Jacques-Cartier, Quebec

Man-made features
 Jacques Cartier Monument (Montreal) 
 Place Jacques-Cartier, street 
 Jacques Cartier Bridge, a.k.a. Pont Jacques-Cartier

Parks
 Jacques-Cartier National Park
 Jacques Cartier Park

Populated places
 La Jacques-Cartier Regional County Municipality
 Sainte-Catherine-de-la-Jacques-Cartier
 Ville Jacques-Cartier, Montreal
 Jacques-Cartier, Sherbrooke

Electoral districts
 Jacques-Cartier, provincial electoral district
 Jacques Cartier (electoral district), a federal electoral district in Quebec from 1867 to 1953
 Jacques-Cartier—Lasalle, former federal electoral district
 Portneuf—Jacques-Cartier, current federal electoral district

Prince Edward Island, Canada
 Jacques Cartier Provincial Park

New York, United States
 Jacques Cartier State Park

Other uses
 
 Jacques Cartier Stakes
 CMA CGM Jacques Cartier, a containership

Cartier, Jacques